Led Bib is a modern jazz group from London, England. Its fourth album, Sensible Shoes, was shortlisted for the 2009 Mercury Prize.

History 
Mark Holub, the band's drummer and leader, formed the group in 2003 while studying at Middlesex University. Their debut album, Arboretum, won the Peter Whittingham Jazz Award in 2005. Their second album, Sizewell Tea, followed in 2007.  A limited-edition live album was released in 2008.  The band's fourth album, Sensible Shoes, was nominated for the 2009 Mercury Prize. Its fifth album, Bring Your Own, was released on 7 February 2011. In 2014, the band released the album The People in Your Neighbourhood and a live vinyl LP The Good Egg.
 In 2016, Led Bib signed with UK-based label RareNoiseRecords. Its new album Umbrella Weather will be released January 20, 2017.

Band members 
 Mark Holub – drums
 Pete Grogan – alto saxophone
 Chris Williams – alto saxophone
 Liran Donin – double bass
 Toby McLaren – keyboards

Discography 
 Arboretum (2005)
 Sizewell Tea (2007)
 Live (2008)
 Sensible Shoes (2009)
 Bring Your Own (2011)
 The People in Your Neighbourhood (2014)
 The Good Egg (2014) - vinyl and download only
 Umbrella Weather (2017)
 It's Morning (2019)

References

External links
 Official webpage

Cuneiform Records artists
English jazz ensembles
Musical groups from London
RareNoiseRecords artists